Saarmund station is a railway station in the municipality of Nuthetal in the Potsdam-Mittelmark district of Brandenburg, Germany. It is served by the line RB 22.

References

Railway stations in Brandenburg
Railway stations in Germany opened in 1918
1918 establishments in Prussia
Buildings and structures in Potsdam-Mittelmark